The Esplanade is a shopping and entertainment complex on Ratchadaphisek Road in Din Daeng district, Bangkok, with a second branch on Rattanathibet Road in Nonthaburi.

History
Anchored by the Esplanade Cineplex, the shopping mall opened in December 2006. The cineplex hosted the 5th World Film Festival of Bangkok in October 2007.

With a retail space of more than 100,000 square metres, the seven-floor complex includes the 12-screen Esplanade Cineplex with 3,000 seats, a B2S book shop along with other shops and restaurants. Other facilities include a Rhythm & Bowl alley, the Sub Zero ice-skating arena, a Tops Supermarket and the 1,500-seat Ratchadalai Musical Theatre.

Design 
The architecture of the Esplanade shopping mall was designed by the Office of Bangkok Architects in collaboration with Contour. The interior of the mall was designed by J+H Boiffils, who had previously designed The Emporium and Siam Paragon shopping malls.

Branches
 Ratchadapisek Bangkok
 Rattanathibet Nonthaburi

See also
 List of shopping malls in Bangkok
 List of shopping malls in Thailand
 List of largest shopping malls in Thailand
 List of cinemas in Thailand

References

External links
 Esplanade Cineplex
 Siam Future property profile

Shopping malls in Bangkok
Cinemas in Thailand
Din Daeng district
Shopping malls established in 2006
2006 establishments in Thailand